The Paskačić (Serbian Cyrillic: Паскачић,  Paskačići / Паскачићи) was a Serbian noble house that served the Serbian Empire, of Dušan the Mighty (r. 1331-1355) and Uroš the Weak (r. 1355-1371), then the Mrnjavčević' Lordship of Prilep (1371–1395) during the Fall of the Serbian Empire. The eponymous founder was kefalija Paskač, and the family base was in Slavište (modern North Macedonia) and they held the modern border region between Serbia and the latter. Paskač had a son, Vlatko Paskačić, (hence, the family is also known as Vlatković (Serbian Cyrillic: Влатковић,  Vlatkovići / Влатковићи)) who received the title of sevastokrator in 1365, when Vukašin Mrnjavčević was declared co-ruler as King of Serbs and Greeks.

History

Family

knez Paskač, married Ozra
sevastokrator Vlatko, married Vladislava
Stefan
kesar Uglješa (fl. 1371 - after 1427)
Stefan (d. ca. 1400)
son (possibly Uroš)

References

Sources
 Grupa autora, „Rodoslovne tablice i grbovi srpskih dinastija i vlastele (prema tablicama Alekse Ivića)“ (drugo znatno dopunjeno i prošireno izdanje), Beograd, 1991. 
 Fajfric, Sveta loza Stefana Nemanje, chapter X
 The Late Medieval Balkans: A Critical Survey from the Late Twelfth Century to the Ottoman Conquest, John Van Antwerp Fine, 1987
 М. Шуица, Немирно доба српског Средњег века, Властела српских обласних господара, Београд 2000.

14th-century Serbian nobility
Serbian noble families
Medieval Macedonia
Serbian Empire